Impi Maria Mirjami Mane (born Mirjami Manelius; 9 May 1929 – 21 April 1974) was a Finnish actress. She is best remembered for her role as the witch in a Roland af Hällström film Noita palaa elämään. The nudity scenes of that film provoked a stir at the time, but her acting skills were questioned by some critics. Mane made only five film appearances during her career. She died after a short illness in 1974 at the age of 44.

Filmography 

Kaunis Veera eli ballaadi Saimaalta (1950)
Noita palaa elämään (1952)
Saariston tyttö (1953)
Kuningas kulkureitten (1953)
Morsiusseppele (1954)

References

External links 
 

1929 births
1974 deaths
Actresses from Helsinki
Finnish film actresses
20th-century Finnish actresses